Amsterdam Commodities N.V. (Acomo) is an international group of companies with its principal business being the trade and distribution of agricultural products. The main trading subsidiaries of Amsterdam Commodities are Catz International B.V. in Rotterdam (spices, nuts and dried fruits), Van Rees Group B.V. in Rotterdam (tea), Red River Commodities Inc. in Fargo, North Dakota, USA, SIGCO Warenhandel in Hamburg, Germany, Red River - Van Eck in Zevenbergen, the Netherlands (confectionery seeds), TEFCO EuroIngredients B.V. in Bodegraven (food ingredients),  Snick EuroIngredients N.V. in Ruddervoorde BE (natural food ingredients) and KingNuts & Raaphorst B.V. in Bodegraven (nuts & rice crackers).

Acomo's trading subsidiaries source and process the raw materials in the production areas and sell them in the consumer markets. Customers are producers in mainly tropical countries (plantations, farmers, cooperations) and industrial consumers of agricultural commodities (spice mills, food processors, wholesalers). Acomo is involved in all the intermediate stages of transportation, processing, packaging, storage, technical analysis, trade finance and distribution.

External links 
Acomo website

Companies based in Rotterdam